Perfluorocarbon emulsions are emulsions containing either bubbles or droplets which have perfluorocarbons inside them. Some of them are commonly used in medicine as ultrasound contrast agents, and others have been studied for use as oxygen therapeutics.

Ultrasound contrast agents 
The most common use of perfluorocarbon emulsions is as ultrasound contrast agents. In this application, microscopic bubbles containing perfluorocarbon gas are injected intravenously and flow through the bloodstream. An ultrasound machine then sends soundwaves through a tissue of interest, and the bubbles reflect the soundwaves to a greater extent than the surrounding tissues, thereby giving the blood greater contrast on ultrasound viewers. This can allow greater visibility of the structure of an organ of interest, or a better indication of the level of blood perfusion or blood volume in an area of interest. The bubbles persist in the blood stream with half-lives of minutes before the perfluorocarbon molecules leave the bubbles and enter the surrounding fluids, before eventually passing through the lungs where they are exhaled.
Notable ultrasound contrast agents include DEFINITYⓇ and OptisonTM which are FDA approved, SONAZOIDⓇ which is approved in Japan, and EchoGen which was formerly approved in Europe but never marketed.

Oxygen therapeutics 
Other perfluorocarbon emulsions have been tested as oxygen therapeutics. When perfluorocarbons are exposed to high concentrations of oxygen, large amounts of oxygen dissolve into the perfluorocarbons. If the perfluorocarbon/oxygen solution is then exposed to a low oxygen environment, then oxygen diffuses out of the solution. Three different approaches sought to utilize this characteristic to improve oxygen delivery to tissue.

Early perfluorocarbon emulsions for oxygen delivery were developed as blood substitutes. They used large-molecule perfluorocarbons with boiling points higher than body temperature which were formed into liquid emulsion droplets. The emulsions were injected intravenously and circulated through the bloodstream, and the droplets picked up oxygen when passing through the lungs and offloaded oxygen when passing through the capillaries in other tissues. The primary form of excretion of the perfluorocarbon was through the reticulo-endothelial system - the droplets would remain in the bloodstream until they were recognized by the immune system, would be taken up by phagocytes, and broken down thereby releasing the perfluorocarbon molecules which eventually pass through the lungs and be exhaled. These high boiling point perfluorocarbons typically had half-lives measured in hours or days. Relatively large doses were required and the and could have side effects including pneumonia. Despite these challenges, Fluosol-DA was approved by the FDA and was marketed as a blood substitute in the United States from 1989 through 1994 when it was withdrawn from the market due to poor sales. Perftoran was approved in the Soviet Union in 1994 and remained in limited use in Russia at least as late as 2019.

The second approach to oxygen delivery tested a perfluorocarbon emulsion not as a blood substitute, but rather as a cerebrospinal fluid (CSF) substitute. In order to increase oxygen delivery to the brains of patients that had reduced blood flow due to acute ischemic stroke, artificial CSF mixed with pre-oxygenated perfluorocarbon emulsion was continuously added into the skull by a ventricular catheter while CSF was continuously removed by a lumbar catheter. Animal studies in cats with acute ischemic stroke showed very strong results, so a clinical trial in four humans was conducted. All four patients survived for 30 days to 2 years before dying of other causes. Enrollment in the trial was slow however, which caused the funding for the project to be cut.

A third approach to oxygen delivery is to move perfluorocarbon molecules into positions where they can enhance the flow of oxygen through the lower parts of the oxygen cascade. While it is difficult to observe the positioning of the perfluorocarbon molecules directly, molecules positioned in the right places between red blood cells and mitochondria may reduce resistance to oxygen flow. In cases where the oxygen tension at the mitochondria are very low, this would expose nearby red blood cells to lower oxygen tensions and cause them to offload more oxygen as described by the oxygen–hemoglobin dissociation curve. The most notable example is dodecafluoropentane emulsion (DDFPe, formerly EchoGen, now NanO2). The drug is injected intravenously then the perfluorocarbon molecules then spread widely before eventually passing through the lungs whey they are evaporated and exhaled. The drug showed very strong results in animal studies of acute ischemic stroke, heart attack and other indications. The drug was tested in a Phase Ib/II clinical trial in 24 patients who had reduced blood flow to the brain due to acute ischemic stroke, where it was intended to increase oxygen delivery to the brain to keep the tissue alive until blood flow could be normalized. The high dose group of patients in the clinical trial had improved functional independence compared to placebo, though the number of patients tested was small and there were confounding factors including differences in stroke severity, so larger clinical trials are needed to confirm the effect. Another perfluorocarbon, perfluorooctyl bromide, has been shown in animal studies to collect in tumor tissue and increase oxygenation of those tumors, potentially by improving the flow of oxygen from red blood cells.

Notable perfluorocarbon emulsions

References

Chemical mixtures